The 2003 UNCAF Nations Cup was an association football tournament.  It was held in two venues in Panama in February 2003, and was played in a round robin tournament, each of the 6 teams playing each other once.  Costa Rica won their record fourth title, and along with the Guatemala, El Salvador, and Honduras, qualified to the 2003 CONCACAF Gold Cup.

Participating teams

Squads
For a complete list of all participating squads see UNCAF Nations Cup 2003 squads

Venue
All matches were played at Estadio Rommel Fernández in Panama City.

Final round

Standings

Awards

Costa Rica, Guatemala and El Salvador qualified for 2003 CONCACAF Gold Cup finals. Honduras won drawing of lots to finish in fourth place, and therefore qualify for playoff against second-placed teams in Caribbean section.

Goalscorers
3 goals

 Freddy García
 Carlos Ruiz

2 goals

 Walter Centeno
 Erick Scott
 Rudis Corrales
 Carlos Figueroa
 Jairo Martínez

1 goal

 Steven Bryce
 Alonso Solís
 Josué Galdámez
 Diego Mejía
 Víctor Velásquez
 César Alegría
 Guillermo Ramírez
 Amado Guevara
 Julio César de León
 Gilberto Murgas
 Emilio Palacios
 Roberto Brown
 Neftalí Díaz
 Mario Méndez
 Víctor René Mendieta, Jr.

 
2003 in Central American football
2003
2003
2002–03 in Salvadoran football
2002–03 in Costa Rican football
2002–03 in Honduran football
2002–03 in Guatemalan football
2002–03 in Nicaraguan football
2002–03 in Panamanian football